Paul John Moore (August 5, 1868 in Newark, New Jersey – January 10, 1938 in Newark, New Jersey) was an American Democratic Party politician who represented New Jersey's 8th congressional district in the United States House of Representatives from 1927–1929. He also was the maternal grandfather of private investigator Thomas Corbally.

Moore was born in Newark, New Jersey, on August 5, 1868, where he attended public and parochial schools, including St. Benedict's Preparatory School. He joined the Newark Fire Department on November 1, 1892 and was promoted through the ranks to chief engineer, serving until his retirement on August 1, 1924, when he began work as a firefighting equipment salesman.

He was elected as a Democrat to the Seventieth Congress, serving in office for a single term, from March 4, 1927 to March 3, 1929. He was an unsuccessful candidate for reelection in 1928 to the Seventy-first Congress and for election in 1930 to the Seventy-second Congress.

Moore served as chairman of the Essex County Democratic Committee in 1928 and 1929. After he left Congress, he again worked as a firefighting equipment salesman in Newark until 1931, when he retired in earnest and moved with his wife, Frances, to a home at 27 Lancaster Avenue in nearby Maplewood, New Jersey. He died in Newark on January 10, 1938, and was interred in Holy Sepulchre Cemetery in East Orange, New Jersey.

References
 
 

1868 births
1938 deaths
Democratic Party members of the United States House of Representatives from New Jersey
People from Maplewood, New Jersey
Burials at Holy Sepulchre Cemetery (East Orange, New Jersey)